Rudolph, Holy Roman Emperor may refer to:
Rudolf I of Germany (1218–1291), King of the Romans
Rudolf II, Holy Roman Emperor (1552–1612), Holy Roman Emperor, King of Hungary, King of Bohemia and Archduke of Austria